Aprominta pannosella is a moth of the family Autostichidae. It is found in Greece.

The wingspan is 15–17 mm. The ground colour of the forewings is dull whitish, sprinkled with black scales.

References

Moths described in 1906
Aprominta
Moths of Europe